The 1979–80 FIS Ski Jumping World Cup was the first World Cup season in ski jumping. It began in Cortina d'Ampezzo, Italy on 27 December 1979 and finished in Štrbské Pleso, Czechoslovakia on 25 March 1980. The individual World Cup was won by Hubert Neuper, who also won the Four Hills Tournament. The Nations Cup was won by Austria.

The event in Vikersund, Norway took place over three days from 29 February to 2 March 1980, with the second competition being cancelled due to strong winds. The total points from both the first and last competitions counted as a single World Cup win: notably, this remains the only time in World Cup history when the results from more than one competition were counted as a single combined event.

Map of all world cup hosts 
All 18 locations which have been hosting world cup events for men this season.

 Four Hills Tournament
 Swiss Tournament
 KOP International Ski Flying Week

Calendar

Men

Standings

Overall

Nations Cup

Four Hills Tournament

References 

FIS Ski Jumping World Cup
1979 in ski jumping
1980 in ski jumping